The Trigon Disunity is a series of three books written by science fiction author Michael P. Kube-McDowell. Emprise was a Philip K. Dick Award nominee, and placed second in the annual Locus Poll for best first novel. The first edition covers were by Ron Miller.
Emprise (1985) : The world has been devastated by the Food and Fuel Wars turning once-powerful nations into loose groupings of isolated farming communities. Barter has replaced currency, and scientists — blamed for the world's misery — are burned at the stake. Hidden in the Idaho hills, astronomer Allen Chandliss struggles to maintain his primitive radio telescope, listening in secret for signs of the intelligent life, which may be the only hope to improve things on Earth. After seventeen years a repeating signal is received from Cassiopeia.  He manages to send a message to a group of scientists in England.  The race is on to decode the signal and then find the resources to respond to it...
Enigma (1986) : Set 150 years after the events of the first book, the 'aliens' turned out to be human and considered themselves to have been colonized from Earth in the distant past.  The Unified Space Survey has been established to make contact with other remnants of the first colonization and to determine what happened to it... 
Empery (1987): The catastrophe that befell the first human interstellar civilisation has been explained; destroyed by the alien Mizari from a black star in the Ursa Major cluster.  But as the new galactic empire is formed the threat of the all-powerful Mizari remains.

Reception
Orson Scott Card praised the trilogy as "fiction that satisfies as much at the story level a it does at the idea level," citing Kube-McDowell's "ability to deal with human beings as political animals."

J. Michael Caparula reviewed Empery in Space Gamer/Fantasy Gamer No. 80. Caparula commented that "Kube-McDowell demonstrates how easily well-meaning representative councils can rapidly degenerate into military bureaucracies. I highly recommend this series."

References

External links
Reviews by Orson Scott Card
 

Science fiction novel trilogies
1980s science fiction novels